The Bonus Arena is an indoor arena in Kingston upon Hull, East Riding of Yorkshire, England, near the Hull Marina. It opened in August 2018 and has hosted music, comedy, and sports events.

Construction
The venue was built on a brownfield site, between the Humber Estuary and Hull City Centre. Local steel, manufactured in Scunthorpe, was used on the project. In June 2018, Bonus Group secured the naming rights to the venue.

Events
Since opening in August 2018, the arena has hosted shows from Van Morrison, the Courteeners, Catfish and the Bottlemen, Two Door Cinema Club, Westlife, Boyzone, George Ezra, Noel Gallagher's High Flying Birds, Sean Paul, James Acaster, Kaiser Chiefs, Stereophonics, Professor Brian Cox, Diversity, Jimmy Carr, Rob Beckett, Romesh Ranganathan, Rhod Gilbert, Jack Whitehall, Michael McIntyre, Richard Ashcroft, The Harlem Globetrotters, NXT UK (WWE brand), Strictly Come Dancing Live!, Question of Sport Live Tour, Blossoms, Elbow, Frank Turner and The Sleeping Souls, The Specials, Bring Me the Horizon, Bastille and You Me at Six.

References

External links

Indoor arenas in England
Tourist attractions in Kingston upon Hull
Sports venues in Kingston upon Hull
Sports venues completed in 2018
Music venues completed in 2018
Darts venues